Catastrophe is a five-part British documentary television series telling the story of the catastrophic events that shaped planet Earth. It is presented by Tony Robinson and was first aired on Channel 4 on 24 November 2008. The series producer was Stephen Marsh with researcher Dr Rhodri Jones.

Episodes

References

External links

2008 British television series debuts
2008 British television series endings
2000s British documentary television series
Channel 4 documentary series
Documentary television series about science
Geological history of Earth